Prentis Hancock (born 14 May 1942) is a British actor, best known for his television roles.

He was a regular cast member of the first season of science fiction series Space: 1999 as Paul Morrow, and also appeared in a number of Doctor Who stories throughout the 1970s - Spearhead from Space and Planet of the Daleks with Jon Pertwee and Planet of Evil and The Ribos Operation with Tom Baker.

Other TV appearances include Spy Trap (as Lieutenant Sanders), Z-Cars, Colditz, Survivors, The New Avengers, Secret Army, Return of the Saint, Minder, Chocky's Children, The Professionals and The Bill.

His film credits include The Thirty Nine Steps (1978) and Defence of the Realm (1985).

Filmography

Television 
 Space: 1999 (1975-1976)
 Doctor Who (1970-1978)
 The Protectors (1973)

Film 
 The Thirty Nine Steps (1978)
 Defence of the Realm (1985)

References

External links
 

1942 births
Living people
Scottish male television actors